Mathies Skjellerup (born 23 May 1996) is a Danish footballer who plays for Danish 2nd Division club VSK Aarhus.

Career

Club career
On 29 August 2020, Skjellerup moved to Danish 2nd Division club VSK Aarhus.

See also
 Hamse Hussein

References

Danish men's footballers
Danish Superliga players
1996 births
Living people
Hobro IK players
Association football forwards
VSK Aarhus players